XEPN were the call letters of a border-blaster radio station licensed to Piedras Negras, Coahuila, Mexico.

It broadcast initially on 885 kHz with a power of 100 watts. The station was gone by the late 1930s, and in 1963, a new XEPN was created, this time on 920 kHz at Paracho, Michoacán. That station no longer exists.

See also
Border blaster
John R. Brinkley

References

Border Radio by Fowler, Gene and Crawford, Bill.  Texas Monthly Press, Austin. 1987 
Mass Media Moments in the United Kingdom, the USSR and the USA, by Gilder, Eric. - "Lucian Blaga" University of Sibiu Press, Romania. 2003

External links
Dedication of the Wolfman Jack Memorial in Del Rio, Texas

Radio stations in Coahuila
Mass media in Piedras Negras, Coahuila